Burton Douglas (November 21, 1930 – July 1, 2000) was an American film, stage and television actor.

Douglas was born in Denver, Colorado, and graduated from the University of Colorado. When he saw the play The Heiress, which starred Ruth Gordon and Whitfield Connor, he decided to take the summer stock theater program. 

Douglas began his film career in 1957, appearing in the film House of Numbers. In the same year, he also appeared in the television series The Thin Man. Douglas had previously worked at the Elitch Gardens. He performed in over 100 stage plays.

In 1958, Douglas appeared in the films Handle with Care, Party Girl, High School Confidential and The Law and Jake Wade. He also had a role in the film Imitation General. Douglas guest-starred in television programs including Gunsmoke, Bonanza, Barnaby Jones, Death Valley Days, Rawhide, Lawman, The Fugitive, Peter Gunn, The Virginian and 12 O'Clock High. He played roles in soap operas including as Ron Christopher in The Edge of Night, and also portrayed Jim Fisk from 1965 and Sam Monroe from 1974 to 1975 in Days of Our Lives.

References

External links 

Rotten Tomatoes profile

1930 births
2000 deaths
People from Denver
Male actors from Denver
American male film actors
American male stage actors
American male television actors
American male soap opera actors
20th-century American male actors
University of Colorado alumni